Tan Sri Chong Hon Nyan (21 June 1924 – 15 March 2020) was a Malaysian politician.

He served as Minister of Health and Minister of Transport.

Election results

Honours
  : 
 Member of the Order of the Defender of the Realm (AMN) (1962)
  : 
 Officer of the Order of the Defender of the Realm (KMN) (1965)
 Recipient of the Malaysian Commemorative Medal (Sliver) (PPM) (1965)
 Companion of the Order of the Defender of the Realm (JMN) (1969)
 Commander of the Order of Loyalty to the Crown of Malaysia (PSM) – Tan Sri (1973)
  :
  Grand Commander of the Exalted Order of Malacca (DGSM) – Datuk Seri (1983)

References

1924 births
2020 deaths
Government ministers of Malaysia
Kuala Lumpur politicians
Malaysian Chinese Association politicians
Malaysian politicians of Chinese descent
Members of the Dewan Rakyat
Commanders of the Order of Loyalty to the Crown of Malaysia
Companions of the Order of the Defender of the Realm
Officers of the Order of the Defender of the Realm
Members of the Order of the Defender of the Realm
Health ministers of Malaysia
Transport ministers of Malaysia